The 2009 Superstars Series season was the sixth season of the Campionato Italiano Superstars (Italian Superstars Championship) and the third season of the International Superstars Series.
Both championships were won by Gianni Morbidelli driving for BMW.

Teams and drivers

Rule changes
Admission of two-doors saloon cars homologated for 4 people
Admission of sequential gearboxes (with a 30 kg weight penalty)
Each round consist of two races
New scoring system

Calendar

Scoring system

Results

Championship standings

Campionato Italiano Superstars – Drivers

Campionato Italiano Superstars – Teams

International Superstars Series

Rookie Superstars Trophy
This ranking is open to drivers who have never participated in the Superstars Series or who have never scored points in previous editions of the Series
(2005-2008 seasons). Points are awarded to the top three finishers

References

External links
Official Superstars website

Superstars Series
Superstars Series seasons